Giuseppe Conca (1904–1972) was an Italian weightlifter who competed in the 1924 Summer Olympics and in the 1928 Summer Olympics. In 1924 he finished 18th in the featherweight class. Four years later he finished fourth in the featherweight class at the Amsterdam Games.

References

External links

1904 births
1972 deaths
Italian male weightlifters
Olympic weightlifters of Italy
Weightlifters at the 1924 Summer Olympics
Weightlifters at the 1928 Summer Olympics
World record setters in weightlifting
20th-century Italian people